K256AS (99.1 FM, "PoP 99.1") is a relay transmitter in Honolulu, Hawaii. Owned by iHeartMedia, the station serves as an analog simulcast of KUCD-HD2, KUCD's HD Radio subchannel, carrying a CHR format focusing on music of China, Japan, the Philippines, and South Korea.

Station History
The license to this station was granted on July 30, 2007, as a retranslator for KDNN, airing traditional Hawaiian music as "Hawai’i No Ka Oi" (translated as "Indeed the Best"). Local radio personalities Lanai and Augie (previously of main KDNN station) hosted their own morning talk show Weekdays from 6 to 9AM.

On June 27, 2014, the format was replaced by the iHeartRadio EDM/Dance platform "Evolution" and switched its HD2 subchannel carrier from KDNN to KHJZ. The station follows the Dance/EDM "Evolution" format, but is customized for Honolulu with local traffic reports and liners targeting its competitors. "Hawai’i No Ka Oi" continues on KDNN's HD2 sub channel and as an iHeartRadio platform.

On September 9, 2016, K256AS dropped the "Evolution" format to take KHJZ's displaced Rhythmic AC/Classic Hip-Hop format, and rebranded as "99.1 Jamz." The move was to allow KUBT to incorporate the Dance/EDM crossovers into its relaunched Rhythmic Top 40 direction.

On November 22, 2019, K256AS dropped the "Jamz" format (which continued on KUBT-HD2 and on its own iHeart stream, rebranded as "Jamz Hawaii") and flipped to an Asian CHR format as PoP! 99.1. The station's new format predominantly features K-pop (including collaborations with U.S. artists), as well as other Chinese, Filipino, and Japanese acts.

References

External links
 
 
 

256AS
Contemporary hit radio stations in the United States
Radio stations established in 2007
256AS
Chinese-language mass media in the United States
Filipino-American culture in Honolulu
Japanese-language mass media in the United States
IHeartMedia radio stations
2007 establishments in Hawaii
Chinese-language radio stations in the United States
Korean-language radio stations in the United States